This is a list of schools in the Roman Catholic Archdiocese of Los Angeles.  The Archdiocese spans three counties: Los Angeles, Ventura and Santa Barbara. Not all the schools listed are operated by the Diocese. Some are operated by religious institutes such as the Jesuits or the Franciscans. There are five universities or colleges, and 51 high schools within the archdiocese.

 the archdiocese has the country's largest Catholic school network.

Universities and colleges

Los Angeles County
 Loyola Marymount University, Westchester, Los Angeles
 Mount St. Mary's College, Brentwood and North University Park, Los Angeles
Ventura County
 St. John's Seminary, Camarillo
 Thomas Aquinas College, Santa Paula

Schools in operation

High schools

Los Angeles County
Los Angeles

 Bishop Alemany High School, Mission Hills
 Bishop Conaty-Our Lady of Loretto High School (Girls), Harvard Heights
 Bishop Mora Salesian High School (Boys), Boyle Heights
 Cathedral High School (Boys), Elysian Park
 Chaminade College Preparatory School, West Hills
 Crespi Carmelite High School (Boys), Encino
 Louisville High School (Girls), Woodland Hills
 Loyola High School (Boys), Harvard Heights
 Immaculate Heart High School (Girls), Los Feliz
 Mary Star of the Sea High School, San Pedro
 Marymount High School (Girls), Bel-Air
 Notre Dame Academy (Girls), Rancho Park
 Notre Dame High School, Sherman Oaks
 Sacred Heart High School (Girls), Lincoln Heights
 St. Bernard High School, Playa del Rey
 St. Genevieve High School, Panorama City
 Verbum Dei Jesuit High School (Boys), Watts

Other cities
 Ramona Convent Secondary School (Girls), Alhambra
 St. John Bosco High School (Boys), Bellflower
 Providence High School, Burbank
 St. Pius X - St. Matthias Academy, Downey
 Junípero Serra High School, Gardena
 Holy Family High School (Girls), Glendale
 St. Mary's Academy (Girls), Inglewood
 Flintridge Sacred Heart Academy (Girls), La Cañada Flintridge
 St. Francis High School (Boys), La Cañada Flintridge
 Bishop Amat Memorial High School, La Puente
 Damien High School (Boys), La Verne, previously Pomona Catholic Girls High School
 St. Joseph High School (Girls), Lakewood
 Paraclete High School, Lancaster
 St. Anthony High School, Long Beach
 Cantwell-Sacred Heart of Mary High School, Montebello
 La Salle High School, Pasadena
 Mayfield Senior School of the Holy Child Jesus (Girls), Pasadena
 St. Monica Academy, Montrose
 Pomona Catholic High School (Girls), Pomona previously Holy Name Academy
 Don Bosco Technical Institute (Boys), Rosemead
 San Gabriel Mission High School (Girls), San Gabriel
 St. Paul High School, Santa Fe Springs
 St. Monica High School, Santa Monica
 Alverno Heights Academy (Girls), Sierra Madre
 Bishop Montgomery High School, Torrance

Santa Barbara County
 Bishop Garcia Diego High School, Santa Barbara
 St. Joseph High School, Santa Maria

Ventura County
 La Reina High School (Girls), Thousand Oaks
 Santa Clara High School, Oxnard
 St. Bonaventure High School, Ventura
 Villanova Preparatory School, Ojai
 St. Augustine Academy, Ventura

Junior high schools

Los Angeles County

Los Angeles City
 Chaminade College Preparatory School, Chatsworth (6–8)
Immaculate Heart Middle School (Girls), Los Feliz (6–8)
St. Mary Magdalen School, Crestview, Los Angeles (5–
 La Reina School (Girls), Thousand Oaks (7–8)

PK–8 schools

Los Angeles City

Blessed Sacrament Catholic School , Hollywood
Our Lady of Grace School , Encino
Our Lady of Loretto , Echo Park
Our Lady of Lourdes , Northridge
Our Mother of Good Counsel , Los Angeles, California
Sacred Heart Elementary School , Los Angeles, California
Saint Sebastian School , West Los Angeles
St. Timothy School , West Los Angeles
St. Genevieve Elementary School , Panorama City
St. Jane Frances de Chantal School , North Hollywood
Our Lady of Guadalupe Rose Hill School {http://www.olgrhschool.org}, Los Angeles

Other cities
Assumption of the Blessed Virgin Mary School , Pasadena
St. Mark Elementary School , Venice
Good Shepherd School , Beverly Hills
St. Rose of Lima School , Maywood
St. Therese Carmelite School , Alhambra
St. Thomas More School , Alhambra
St. Matthias Elementary School  Huntington Park
St. Margaret Mary Elementary School*, Lomita
St. Monica Catholic Elementary School , Santa Monica

Ventura County
Holy Cross School , Ventura
La Purisma Concepcion , Lompoc
Our Lady of Guadalupe School , Oxnard
Our Lady of the Assumption , Ventura
Sacred Heart School , Ventura
Saint Anthony's School, Oxnard
Santa Clara School, Oxnard
St. Mary Magdalen School , Camarillo
St. Sebastian School, Santa Paula

Santa Barbara county
St. Raphael school

K–8 schools

Los Angeles County

Los Angeles City
Holy Spirit School, Los Angeles, California
Immaculate Heart of Mary School, East Hollywood
St. Martin of Tours School , Brentwood
St. Paul the Apostle Church and School, West Los Angeles
Our Lady of Grace, Encino
Our Lady of the Valley, Canoga Park
St. Bridget of Sweden School|St. Bridget of Sweden, Van Nuys
St. Catherine of Siena, Reseda
St. Cyril of Jerusalem, Encino
St. Francis de Sales, Sherman Oaks
St. Mel, Woodland Hills
St. Elizabeth, Van Nuys
St. Michael's School , South Los Angeles
St. Bernardine of Siena , Woodland Hills
St. Joseph the Worker, Winnetka
Holy Name of Jesus School, Los Angeles
St. Vincent School, Los Angeles

Other cities
All Souls World Language Catholic School , Alhambra
St. Therese Carmelite School, Alhambra
Incarnation Parish School,  Glendale - established 1937
St. Elizabeth of Hungary School , Altadena
St. Barnabas Parish School , Long Beach
St. Joseph Elementary School , Pomona
St. Anne Elementary School , Santa Monica
St. Jude the Apostle School ,  Westlake Village
St. Philip the Apostle School , Pasadena, CA
Our Lady of Malibu School . Malibu
Santa Teresita School . Los Angeles, California
Holy Family School , South Pasadena
St. Mary School, Palmdale
St. Christopher Parish School, West Covina, CA

Ventura County
St. Anthony School, Oxnard
St. Paschal Baylon School, Thousand Oaks

1–8 schools

Los Angeles County

Other cities
Ramona Convent Elementary School, Alhambra

Ventura County
 St. Rose of Lima School , Simi Valley

Closed schools

Universities and colleges
 Marymount California University, Rancho Palos Verdes (Closed in 2022)
 Our Lady Queen of Angels Seminary, Mission Hills (Closed in 1995)

High schools
 Corvallis High School (California), (Girls) Studio City (Closed in 1987)
 Daniel Murphy High School (Boys), Los Angeles (Closed in 2008), previously St. John Vianney High School
 Fermin Lasuen High School, all boys, San Pedro
 Holy Name Academy, all girls, Pomona, closed 1949. It reopened as co-ed Pomona Catholic High School.
 Los Angeles College, the junior seminary of the Archdiocese of Los Angeles
 Mount Carmel High School (Los Angeles), closed 1976
 Pater Noster High School, Los Angeles (closed 1991)
 Pius X High School, Downey, California (merged with St. Mathias 1995)
 Preparatory Institute of Notre Dame, (girls) Sunland (Closed 1960s)
 Queen of Angels Academy, Compton (Closed in 2002)
 Regina Caeli High School, Compton (girls), renamed Queen of Angels 1995
 St. Agatha's School Los Angeles, California
 St. Michael's High School (girls), Los Angeles (merged with Regina Caeli 1995)
 Villa Cabrini Academy (girls), Burbank (Closed 1971)
 Our Lady Queen of Angels, Los Angeles, California, (1926-1982), Grade school and Girls High School 1926-c 1967, Middle School 1969 to 1982. Approx address 725 N Hill st, 90012
 Bellarmine Jefferson High School, Burbank, California (1944-2018)

References

External links
 Roman Catholic Archdiocese of Los Angeles

Schools in the Roman Catholic Archdiocese

Los Angeles Roman Catholic Archdiocese

Los Angeles, Roman Catholic Diocese of
Education in Los Angeles